The Mthonjaneni Local Municipality council consists of twenty-five members elected by mixed-member proportional representation. Thirteen councillors are elected by first-past-the-post voting in thirteen wards, while the remaining twelve are chosen from party lists so that the total number of party representatives is proportional to the number of votes received.

The municipality was enlarged at the time of the 2016 South African municipal elections when part of the disbanded Ntambanana Local Municipality was merged into it.

In the election of 3 August 2016 the Inkatha Freedom Party (IFP) won a majority of fourteen seats on the council. The party lost its majority in the election of 1 November 2021, obtaining a plurality of twelve seats.

Results 
The following table shows the composition of the council after past elections.

December 2000 election

The following table shows the results of the 2000 election.

March 2006 election

The following table shows the results of the 2006 election.

May 2011 election

The following table shows the results of the 2011 election.

August 2016 election

The following table shows the results of the 2016 election.

August 2016 to November 2021 by-elections 

In a by-election held on 25 July 2018, a ward previously held by an ANC councillor was won by the IFP candidate. Council composition was reconfigured as seen below:

November 2021 election

The following table shows the results of the 2021 election.

By-elections from November 2021
The following by-elections were held to fill vacant ward seats in the period from November 2021. 

Ward 12 became vacant due to the death of the IFP councillor. In the by-election on 31 August 2022, the IFP retained its seat, with both it and the ANC gaining ground at the expense of the NFP.

After the resignation of the ANC councillor in ward 5, a by-election saw the IFP candidate winning the seat, ensuring the IFP has an outright majority, and no longer needs to rely on other parties.

References

Mthonjaneni
Elections in KwaZulu-Natal